Grapholitini is a tribe of tortrix moths.

Genera

References